Mount Zion Township is located in Macon County, Illinois. As of the 2010 census, its population was 7,131 and it contained 2,878 housing units. In 2009, Milam Township to the south was merged into Mount Zion Township.

Cities and towns 
 Hervey City
 Mount Zion
 Turpin

Adjacent townships 
 Long Creek Township (north)
 Dora Township, Moultrie County (east and southeast)
 Penn Township, Shelby County (south)
 South Macon Township (southwest and west)
 South Wheatland Township (west and northwest)

Geography

Demographics

References

External links
City-data.com
Illinois State Archives

Townships in Macon County, Illinois
Townships in Illinois